Show Flat is a 1936 British comedy film directed by Bernard Mainwaring and starring Eileen Munro, Anthony Hankey and Clifford Heatherley. It was made at Shepperton Studios. The screenplay concerns a struggling couple who take over a vacant flat in order to impress somebody by holding a dinner there.

Cast
 Eileen Munroas Aunt Louisa 
 Anthony Hankey as Paul Collett 
 Clifford Heatherley as Ginnsberg 
 Max Faber as Ronnie Chubb 
 Polly Ward as Mary Blake 
 Vernon Harris as Tom Vernon  
 Miki Decima as Miss Jube 
 Billy Bray as Fox 
 Victor Rietti

References

Bibliography
Low, Rachael. Filmmaking in 1930s Britain. George Allen & Unwin, 1985.
Wood, Linda. British Films, 1927–1939. British Film Institute, 1986.

External links
 

1936 films
1936 comedy films
British comedy films
Films shot at Shepperton Studios
Films set in England
British films based on plays
Films directed by Bernard Mainwaring
Films produced by Anthony Havelock-Allan
Paramount Pictures films
British black-and-white films
British and Dominions Studios films
1930s English-language films
1930s British films